"Love Lady" is a single by British R&B group Damage, released on 28 July 1997 as the sixth and final single from the band's debut album, Forever. The song peaked at #33 on the UK Singles Chart, becoming the band's second-worst performing single from the album. The song was the band's first single to have been produced by Femi Fem, and was heavily remixed for its release as a single. The music video features the band performing the song in the middle of the desert. The music video does not appear online anywhere and has never been released commercially, however it was regularly re-broadcast on The Vault as part of the channel's Damage: Our Career in Music special. Jade Jones refers to it as his favorite video.

Track listing
 CD1
 "Love Lady" (Femi Fem's Radio Mix)
 "Love Lady" (Filo Freak Remix)
 "Love Lady" (Lucas Remix)
 "Love Lady" (MVP First Born Mix)

 CD2
 "Love Lady" (Da Funkstarz House Full Vocal Edit)
 "Love Lady" (Da Funkstarz Vocal Dub)
 "Love Lady" (Dubaholics Dub)
 "Love Lady" (Groove Chronicles Groove Mix)
 "Love Lady" (Da Funkstarz Epic Camouflage Dub)
 "Love Lady" (Femi Fem's Radio Mix)

 12" vinyl
 "Love Lady" (Femi Fem's Radio Mix)
 "Love Lady" (Lucas Remix)
 "Storyteller" (Linslee Campbell, Michelle Escoffery, Simpson, Harriott, produced by Linslee)
 "Love Lady" (Lucas Remix Instrumental)
 "Love Lady" (MVP First Born Mix)

 Cassette
 "Love Lady" (Femi Fem's Radio Mix)
 "Love Lady" (Filo Freak Remix)

 12" vinyl - Red (Limited Edition of 500)
 "Love Lady" (Lucas Remix)
 "Love Lady" (MVP First Born Mix)
 "Love Lady" (Groove Chronicles Groove Mix)

 12" vinyl - Blue (Limited Edition of 500)"
 "Love Lady" (Da Funkstarz House Full Vocal Edit)
 "Love Lady" (Da Funkstarz Vocal Dub)
 "Love Lady" (Da Funkstarz Epic Camouflage Dub)
 "Love Lady" (Dubaholics Dub)

External links
[ Allmusic biography]

References

1997 singles
Damage (British band) songs
Big Life Records singles
1997 songs